Emmanuel Awuah Baffour (born 2 April 1989 in New Edubiase) is a Ghanaian professional footballer who plays for Ashanti Gold as a striker.

Club career

Early career
Baffour began his playing career in the Ghanaian amateur club Ashalaja FC before moving to Premier League club Liberty Professionals. Before the 2008–2009 season, he joined Premier League club Tema Youth.

New Edubiase United
In 2010–2011 season, Baffour joined New Edubiase United. He scored 5 goals in his debut season, and during the following he scored 21 goals which made him the league's top goalscorer at the end of 2011–2012 season on 27 May 2012.

Mamelodi Sundowns
He joined Mamelodi Sundowns on 19 June 2012, signing a two-year deal with an option of an additional year.

International career

Ghana national team
In December 2011, Baffour was named to the Ghana national football team's provisional 25-man squad for the 2012 Africa Cup of Nations, but was not included by the Ghana national football team technical staff for the tournament's final 23-man squad.

On 26 February 2012, Baffour was called up to the Ghana squad to face Chile. Baffour made his Ghana debut against Chile on 29 February 2012 at the PPL Park in Chester, Pennsylvania, USA.

Honours

Individual
 Ghana Premier League Top Scorer (1): 2012

References

External links

1989 births
Living people
Association football forwards
Liberty Professionals F.C. players
Tema Youth players
New Edubiase United F.C. players
Ghana Premier League players
Ghanaian footballers
Ghana international footballers
Mamelodi Sundowns F.C. players
Ghanaian expatriate footballers
Expatriate footballers in Lebanon
Ghanaian expatriate sportspeople in Lebanon
Al Egtmaaey SC players
Lebanese Premier League players
Ghana Premier League top scorers